Antonie Misset (14 January 1901 – 1 November 1974) was a Dutch wrestler. He competed in the Greco-Roman light heavyweight event at the 1924 Summer Olympics.

References

External links
 

1901 births
1974 deaths
Olympic wrestlers of the Netherlands
Wrestlers at the 1924 Summer Olympics
Dutch male sport wrestlers
Sportspeople from The Hague